A platoon leader (NATO) or platoon commander (more common in Commonwealth militaries and the US Marine Corps) is the officer in charge of a platoon. This person is usually a junior officer – a second or first lieutenant or an equivalent rank. The officer is usually assisted by a platoon sergeant. Some special units, such as specific aviation platoons and special forces, require a captain as platoon leader, due to the nature and increased responsibility of such assignments. Platoons normally consist of three or four sections (Commonwealth) or squads (US).

Responsibilities of a Platoon Leader 

The duties and responsibilities of a platoon leader is similar in the armies. Based on the US Army publications, it is possible to address that a platoon leader:

 Leads the platoon in supporting the higher headquarters missions. He bases his actions on his assigned mission and intent and concept of his higher commanders.
 Conducts troop leading procedures.
 Maneuvers squads and fighting elements.
 Synchronizes the efforts of squads.
 Looks ahead to the next “move" of the platoon.
 Requests, controls, and synchronizes supporting assets.
 Employs mission command systems available to the squads and platoon. 
 Checks with squad leaders ensuring 360-degree, three-dimensional security is maintained.
 Checks with weapons squad leader controlling the emplacement of key weapon systems.
 Issues accurate and timely reports.
 Places himself where he is most needed to accomplish the mission.
 Assigns clear tasks and purposes to the squads.
 Understands the mission and commander’s intent two levels up (company and battalion).
 Receives on-hand status reports from the platoon sergeant, section leaders, and squad leaders during planning.
 Coordinates and assists in the development of the obstacle plan.
 Oversees and is responsible for property management

In Mechanized infantry units, also, the platoon leader:
 Normally dismounts when the situation causes the platoon to dismount.
 Serves as Armoured personnel carrier or Infantry fighting vehicle commander when mounted.
 Develops the fires with the platoon sergeant, section leaders, and squad leaders.

See also 
Crew chief (disambiguation)
Team leader
Squad leader
Platoon Leader (film)
Platoon Leader (memoir)
Platoon Leaders Class

References

Military organization
Military ranks
Military leadership